The Serra do Papagaio State Park is a state park in the state of Minas Gerais, Brazil. It protects a mountainous region of Atlantic Forest.

Location

The Serra do Papagaio State Park is divided between the municipalities of Aiuruoca (15.76%), Alagoa (5.38%), Baependi (39.93%), Itamonte (34.54%) and Pouso Alto (4.39%) in Minas Gerais.
The park is located in the Mantiqueira Mountains, and includes parts of the Garrafão and Papagaio ranges.
About half the area has steep slopes and altitudes above .

Environment

The park holds an important remnant of Atlantic Forest.
It includes meadows, forests and enclaves of Araucaria forest.
It is the source of the headwaters of major rivers that form the Rio Grande.
Geographically it is connected to the northern part of the Itatiaia National Park, helping protect fauna and flora by providing a continuous area of protected mountains.

Construction of a hydroelectric power plant in the municipality of Aiuruoca, within the Serra da Mantiqueira Environmental Protection Area and part of the Serra do Papagaio State Park, has caused outrage in the local community and environmentalists.
It is part of a program to build 65 small hydroelectric plants in Brazil, including 33 in Minas Gerais, which would threaten the last remnants of riparian forest in the state.

History

It is administered by the Instituto Estadual de Florestas.
It is part of the Mantiqueira Mosaic of conservation units, created in 2006.

Gallery

Notes

Sources

State parks of Brazil
Protected areas of Minas Gerais
1998 establishments in Brazil